Detto may refer to:

People
  (1845–1910), German politician
 Claudio Detto (born 1950), Italian painter
 Detto Mariano (1937–2020), Italian musician

Other
 Detto, fatto., a 2012 EP

See also
 Deto (disambiguation)